Stadio Marcello Torre is a multi-use stadium in Pagani, Italy.  It is currently used mostly for football matches and is the home ground of Paganese Calcio 1926.  The stadium holds 5,981 people. On November 24, 2008 a strong wind caused the collapse of a section of the stadium.

Marcello Torre